Cabugao, officially the Municipality of Cabugao, is a 1st class municipality in the province of Ilocos Sur, Philippines. According to the 2020 census, it has a population of 38,884 people.

Etymology
In the beginning, the place was only a wilderness, a thick forest where peaceful nomadic tribesman roamed and hunted. For fish, which were also abundant, there was a river. On these occasional visits, the hunters noticed the fertile and flatlands that can be tilled and they decided to stay. They were the first settlers.
 
As to how the name of the town evolved, there are interesting legends transmitted through generations.
 
Some claimed that during the pre-Hispanic regime, there were also numerous uncivilized warring tribes. Kabu Angaw, a man with a good sense of humor headed one such tribe. In an intertribal rivalry, Kabu Angaw suffered defeat forcing him and his remaining warriors to move southward until they reached the village where the friendly and hospitable nomads settled.  Kabu Angaw's natural carefree manners and ability to relate entertaining stories endeared him to the settlers especially the young. His fairness and righteousness earned him respect and esteem, eventually making him as the village chieftain. His leadership became legendary so much that his people were referred to as “ taga Kabu Angaw”. When he died, the villagers deeply mourned on such a great loss.
 
On the other hand, some assert that the village by the river was ruled by a certain Aggao. When the Spaniards arrived, his subjects called him “Cabo Aggao” meant chief. Finding difficulty in pronouncing the headman's name, the Spaniards contracted it to “ Cabugao” denoting not only the ruler but also the place he ruled.
 
As time passed, Kabu Angaw or Cabogao was transformed into Cabugao.

Geography
Cabugao is the second northernmost town of the province of Ilocos Sur. It is accessible to almost all modes of land transportation and a 7–kilometer portion of the MacArthur Highway passes through the town center.

It is bounded on the north by Sinait; on the south by San Juan; on the east by Nueva Era, Ilocos Norte and the Cordillera Mountain Ranges; and on the west by the South China Sea.

Topography
The Cordillera mountain range borders on the eastern part of the municipality. Hills are located in all the four corners of the municipality.  Off the coast of Barangay Sabang there is Salomague Island.

The Cabugao River is the largest river in the municipality. Two tributaries to the east feed the main channel of the Cabugao River.  The headwaters of the north fork of the Cabugao River originate in Sitio Caset in Barangay Maradodon and the southern fork's headwaters originate in Sitio Gaco in Barangay Cacadiran. Cabugao's drinking water supply comes from three water resources in the Cordillera mountain range.

The barangays that lie along the Cabugao River are flood prone areas during the rainy season. The uncontrollable surges of water erode the properties that line the Cabugao River endangering life and limb. The creek that runs through the poblacion easily clogs up in rain causing portions near it to be inundated.

Barangays
The municipality of Cabugao is divided into 33 barangays These barangays are headed by elected officials: Barangay Captain, Barangay Council, whose members are called Barangay Councilors. All are elected every 3 years.

4 are in the poblacion and 29 in the rural areas, further subdivided into 94 sitios.

Climate

The climate of Cabugao is characterized by two (2) well-pronounced seasons; dry and wet. Dry season is usually experienced from November to April; while wet (rainy) season starts in May until October. Occasional rainfall also occurs at the onset of the dry season caused by the north-east monsoon passing through the region. The town is naturally shielded from the trade winds by the Cordillera Mountain Ranges. In the middle of May, drift winds from the Pacific Ocean sweep over the area, signaling the imminent wet season. 
 
Average relative humidity is 87.3%.

Demographics

In the 2020 census, Cabugao had a population of 38,884.

The first data on population of the Municipality of Cabugao was recorded on March 2, 1903, indicating 8,848 residents. This number steadily increased to 35,706 in the 2010 census. The biggest population increase was on December 31, 1918, with 3,754.

Religion
The people of Cabugao are generally religious. A majority of the population is Roman Catholic, while a sizable number practice other religions such as the Iglesia Filipina Independiente, Iglesia ni Cristo, various Protestants groups, the Church of Jesus the Latter Day Saints, and Islam.

Economy 

People are primarily engaged in farming and fishing. Cabugao, with its big poblacion, is one of the most urbanized towns in the province.
 
While it is true that many natives of the town have gone to greener pastures in other parts of the country and abroad, the number of migrants has been offset by the number of immigrants – Pangasinenses, Bataguenos, Kapampangans and Maranaos who have come for trade and commerce and have stayed here for good.

People's organizations and non-government organizations are active in the municipality responding to the needs of the community.

Government
Cabugao, belonging to the first congressional district of the province of Ilocos Sur, is governed by a mayor designated as its local chief executive and by a municipal council as its legislative body in accordance with the Local Government Code. The mayor, vice mayor, and the councilors are elected directly by the people through an election which is being held every three years.

Elected officials

Tourism
Pug-os Located along the national highway and two (2) kilometers north of the poblacion, boasts of its fine beach – its white sand stretching to more than half a kilometer. This attribute and the gradually sloping seabed make it a top favorite among town mates and tourists for swimming, picnics or fun hiking. Two hotel beach resorts, Ponce del Mar and restaurant, and the privately leased municipality-owned Cabugao Public Beach and Park (renamed Cabugao Beach Resort) serve as venues for conventions, conferences, seminars and social occasions such as weddings, baptisms and birthdays. For those who want to seek the thrill of the paranormal, Pug-os National High School should be the perfect place to visit. Not only you can admire the history of the school, but you can also experience the haunting at that school, such as the famous white lady which walks or appears during a full moon or light rainy evening, a poltergeist in a classroom that is said to move chairs and is usually active a few hours before the morning classes starts, and the mysterious student found pacing in a certain unoccupied room in the school campus.
 
Salomague The historic port of Salomague located in this barangay explains why it holds the distinction of being one of the few Ilocos barangays printed on international mariners’ map. The Port of Salomague was an ancient port of call of seafarers, merchants and traders from different Asian countries. During the American occupation, it served as a mooring place from boats that ferried across the Pacific where thousands of Ilocanos worked at sugar plantations in Hawaii and California. Now leased to a private corporation, It is the transshipment port of goods and products to Taiwan. It is also the unloading point of commercial fishing vessels. The Salomague Island is used to have inhabitants until the owners choose to have it uninhabited. A 1109-hectare island, it can be reached in less than five (5) minutes ride through a banca. A municipal ordinance has declared the waters around it a fish sanctuary area, thus making it more attractive to sports fishers and scuba divers who regularly visit it. Picnickers also frequent its eastern coast.
 
Dardarat Eco-tourism structures were in place in Barangay Dardarat attracting hordes of town mates and local tourists and earning for its barangay captain a prestigious award until typhoon “Feria” unleashed her fury razing down to the seafloor said structures. Only mangrove seedlings planted by teachers and Japanese volunteers provide the contrast to a now, desolate coastland. At the southern end of the place is the Dardarat Lighthouse, a Philippine Coast Guard facility that guides marine vessels.
 
Sabang Sabang is the take-off point for Salomague Island. Members of the Saint Claire, a Roman Catholic religious congregation, have established a place in the barangay facing the Salomague Island or also known as Puro.

Salapasap During the peak season of beach-lovers, Salapasap Beach is good alternative to Pug-os Beach. Barangay cottages are rented out of cheap rates.
 
Namruangan Namruangan is known for its rich fishing grounds. Situated at the mouth of Cabugao River, it shares with barangay Salapasap the “ipon” (small fish) fishing ground. “Bugi” (fry) abound in the place. During clear weather and fish season, fisherfolk gracefully pull the “daklis” (a big fishing net) to the tune of an Ilokano folksong.
 
Daclapan Daclapan is also a good place for swimming and picnics. Daclapan Coast or Cabugao Bay in local maps, is closely guarded by the barangay inhabitants against illegal fishing.
 
Saint Mark the Evangelist Parish Church Built in 1772, it lost part of its aesthetics when it was burned in 1965. The architectural charm of its interiors was no longer restored. However, renovation in recent years has improved its beauty.
 
Old Cabugao Public Market This was the first project of the then Mayor Pacifico P Apostol. This has been converted to Cabugao Park.

Municipal Government Center Several public buildings and structures converge in the Municipal Government Center. Among them are the municipal hall, the 66-year-old Lady Magarang, World War II Veterans’ Memorial, Children's Park and the Cabugao Cultural and Sports Complex.

Northern Ilocos Sur Trade Center (NISTC) As the municipal public market, its strategic location on a spacious municipal property along the national highway north of the poblacion proper is strengthened by the proximity of the “dayo”,  the slaughterhouse compound, and of course, the municipality-owned Cabugao Ice Plant that is within its arm's reach. It is a Department of Health Awardee as the Cleanest and Healthiest Public Market in Region I for 2002. This was erected under the administration oF Mayor Andrea Soller Tan. The finishing touches and its grand opening was administered by Mayor Diocaesar C Suero.
 
Historic Hills and Mountains Hills and a mountain stand out as reminders of the valor and heroism of our people against the three colonial powers.

The Balaywak hills hosted a military outpost constructed by Diego Silang and his men in their bid to challenge the Spanish might. Balaywak was also a battle site between Gabriela Silang and her Ilocano and Tingguian allies on one hand and the Spaniards and their Filipino allies on the other hand. For those who seek for a one-of-a-kind paranormal experience, Balaywak is the place to be. The bridge found at Balaywak is said to be haunted by two white ladies and the adjacent sitios and barangays also has their own haunts.
 
Mount Bimmuaya, a plateau in Barangay Maradodon, was drenched with blood of at least 18 Filipinos who perished in a clash against the Americans during the Filipino-American War.
 
Balay-aran, a hill in Barangay Caellayan, was the birthplace and bastion of the town’s resistance movement against the Japanese occupation Army.
 
Springs and Waterfalls Several springs notably Magarang, Roma, Kinalian, Baterina and Bacques have been tapped to provide potable water to the poblacion and to some eastern barangays. A popular waterfall, Kimmandela – so named because even from a distance it resembles a candle ("Kandela" is the Ilocano term for "candle") is a remarkable sight. The springs or waterfalls can be reached through hiker-friendly mountain trails and settlements at the foot of the Ilocos Mountain Range.
 
Cabugao River Cabugao River has two channels: one starts in Sitio Caset, Barangay Maradodon and another in Sitio Rebba, Barangay Cacadiran. The two channels meet at Barangay Alinaay and form a big branch until its mouth in Barangays Namruangan and Salapasap. It is a 12-kilometer body of water where farm animals drink and take a bath, fishermen catch fish and crabs, housewives do their laundry, and construction builders quarry stone and pebbles. The local government's program on Save Cabugao River project is a recipient of the Likas Yaman Award for Environmental Excellence as the Most Outstanding LGU-Initiated Environmental Project in Region I conferred in 2007.

Libunao Protected Landscape A protected watershed area in Sitio Caset, Barangay Maradodon.

Culture
Town Fiesta The annual town fiesta is held in honor of the town's patron saint, St, Mark the Evangelist, whose feast day falls on April 25 and the name of the festival is "San Markos" (Saint Mark). It is usually a week-long festivity led by the municipal government and the church. Agro-industrial fairs, sports fests, indigenous cultural shows, coordinated and implemented with the assistance of farmers’ groups, sports’ associations, and cultural groups enliven the merrymaking.

Cultural Gems The creativity of the people is tangibly demonstrated through their cultural innovations, “Aweng ti Kawayan” (Sound of the Bamboo), a musical instrument, is unique throughout Ilocandia. “Kinnaras”, a dance reenacting how fishermen catch fish within a fish sanctuary and “Kalapati”, a dance that mimics the graceful and gentle movements of the dove, have their origins in the town having been choreographed by the Cabugao teachers.
 
Kawayan Strength and Beauty of Cabugao: The present administration is bent on promoting “kawayan” (Bamboo), the tallest grass, as a prime agricultural and forecast product. Bamboo culture from the choice of their planting materials to the manufacturing or fabrication of bamboo products or furniture demands strength and beauty of the character of our people. The people of Cabugao can always look up to Malakas (Strength) and Maganda (Beauty) who came from the “Kawayan” as paragons of virtues for the development of the town.

Education
Cabugao has 26 public elementary schools and private primary schools, 3 public high schools ( Pug-os National High School,Cabugao [Turod] National High School[CNHS], Lipit National High School, and Sisim National High School), 1 private high school (Cabugao Institute[C.I
]).

Trivia
 Salomague Port in Cabugao was an ancient port that the place of departure for over 100 sacadas destined to work in the sugarcane fields of Hawaii in the 1930s-40s.
 According to local legend, the first rubber sandals entered Ilocos Sur through Salomague Port.  As a result, rubber sandals are sometimes called ismagel, which is an Ilocano-ized word meaning "smuggle."
 The novel "Tree" by F. Sionil Jose begins in Cabugao.

References

External links
Cabugao Website
Cabugao Portal Online
Pasyalang Ilocos Sur
Philippine Standard Geographic Code
Philippine Census Information
Local Governance Performance Management System

Municipalities of Ilocos Sur